Phytometra duplicalis is a species of moth of the family Erebidae which is native to sub-Saharan Africa. It has been found in Cameroon, Sierra Leone, Zambia and South Africa.

References

Boletobiinae
Moths of Africa